Cychrus kryzhanovskii is a species of ground beetle in the subfamily of Carabinae. It was described by Deuve in 2000.

References

kryzhanovskii
Beetles described in 2000